By All Means is the debut album by By All Means in 1988 on Island Records. The album includes the hits "I Surrender To Your Love" and "You Decided to Go".

Track listing

Personnel

By All Means
Lynn Roderick: Vocals
Billy Sheppard: Vocals
James "Jimmy" Varner: Vocals. Keyboards, Drum Programming and Rhythm Arrangements

Additional Personnel
Alfie Silas, Lynne Fiddmont: Backing Vocals
Charles Fearing, Jeff Curtis, Paul Jackson, Jr: Guitars
Paulinho da Costa: Percussion
Brandon Fields, Gerald Albright: Saxophone
Terry Carter, The Fly Guys: Keyboards and Drum Programming

References
 [ Allmusic]
 Discogs

External links
 
 By All Means at Discogs
 Facebook Page
 Soulwalking page

1988 debut albums
Island Records albums